The eighth season of the animated television series Archer, subtitled Dreamland, began airing on April 5, 2017, and consisted of eight episodes. This season is also the first to air on FXX since the series was moved from FX.

Production 
FX renewed Archer for three more seasons with each season consisting of a total of eight episodes. On January 12, 2017, it was announced that the series would relocate to FX's sister channel FXX, beginning with Season 8 onwards.

This season resolves the cliffhanger from last season, which ended with Archer floating lifeless in a swimming pool after being shot several times. It is revealed that Archer survived but has been in a coma for three months, trapped in a 1947 noir-esque Los Angeles setting called Dreamland. It also reveals the fate of Woodhouse (whose original voice actor George Coe died in 2015), the heroin-addicted valet of Archer dying shortly before the season premiere.

This season is notable for portraying Sterling Archer in a more sympathetic light than all previous seasons, i.e. far less narcissistic and irritable.

After the success of the hidden scavenger hunts in Seasons 6 and 7, animator Mark Paterson devised an augmented reality mobile phone app called Archer, PI to run side-by-side with the show. It featured 8 interactive cases, one for each episode, that could only be accessed by viewing the episode through the phone's camera, "something that had never been attempted in the history of television" according to the creator. The app won two Clio Awards in 2017 and was a finalist for a number of awards in 2018.

The episode "Auflösung" is dedicated to George Coe, who was the voice of Woodhouse in the first four seasons of the show and died on July 18, 2015 before the episode aired.

Episodes

Critical response
On Rotten Tomatoes the season has an approval rating of 86% based on 14 reviews, with an average rating of 7.5/10. On Metacritic the season has a score of 72 out of 100, based on 8 critics, indicating "generally favorable reviews".

References

External links
 
 

2017 American television seasons
Archer (2009 TV series) seasons
Fiction set in 1947
Neo-noir television series
Metafictional television series